Nonkululeko is a given name. Notable people with the name include:

Nonkululeko Gobodo (born 1960), South African businesswoman
Nonkululeko Mlaba (born 2000), South African cricketer
Nonkululeko Nyembezi-Heita (born 1960), South African engineer and businesswoman

African given names